Eugene Marion Klaaren (1937-October 17, 2015) was a historian and professor of religion.  He held a BA from Hope College, an MA from Emory University, a BD from Western Theological Seminary, and a PHD from Harvard University.  He then became an Emeritus Professor of Wesleyan University.  His book Religious Origins of Modern Science: Belief in Creation in Seventeenth-Century Thought (Eerdmans, 1977) remains "an important one. It is written in a scholarly and fairly dense style but is also accessible to non-specialists."  His Religious Origins book is based on his PhD thesis: "Belief in creation and the rise of modern science a study in the representative natural philosophy and theology of Robert Boyle and other seventeenth century figures" (1970). Klaaren died in 2015.

Selected works
Religious origins of modern science : belief in creation in seventeenth-century thought (1977)
Dooyeweerd's criticism of Kant (1960)

References

External links
Faculty Page

1937 births
2015 deaths
Hope College alumni
Emory University alumni
Harvard University alumni
Wesleyan University faculty
American historians